Joseph Colombo (1914–1978) was an American gangster and boss of the Colombo crime family.

Joe Colombo may also refer to:

 Joe Colombo (designer) (1930–1971), Italian industrial designer
 Joe Coulombe (1930–2020), American entrepreneur
 Joseph Colombo (architect) (died 1970), Maltese architect